St Catharine's College Boat Club (SCCBC or Catz) is the rowing club for members of St Catharine's College, Cambridge, England.

In the Lent Bumps, the men's first VIII resided largely near the boundary of the 1st and 2nd divisions, but spent a few years in the top-10, reaching as high as 6th in the 1930s and in 1968, and more recently, peaking at 9th in 2002. They now reside in the 1st division. In the May Bumps, St Catharine's spent most of the time before the 1940s in the 2nd division, but rose to 4th in 1947 and 1961, with the 2nd VIII reaching the 1st division in 1963. In 1967, the 2nd VIII actually managed to bump the 1st VIII on the second day, but the 1st VIII bumped back the following day. Since then, the 1st VIII have spent most of the time in the middle to lower half of the 1st division. Between 1998 and 2004, the men's 1st VIII were bumped only once and rose to 2nd position, partially helped by having many oarsmen trialling for university crews, but St Catharine's have never yet taken a headship. They are now sitting 5th on the river (2013).

The first women's VIII first raced in 1980, and in the Lent Bumps have spent most of the time since 1990 in the 1st division, ranking as high as 6th in 1997, but had fallen into the 2nd in 2003 and 2006. Since then have returned to the center of the first division. In the May Bumps, St Catharine's 1st women's IV rose quickly to 3rd in 1989. When the races were reorganised following the change to eight-oared boats, the 1st women's VIII were placed in 8th. In 2002, they managed to get to 7th, the highest they've yet managed in eight-oared boats in the May Bumps, but the following three years saw St Catharine's fall to the top of the 2nd division. 2006–07 saw a turn-around, and they have since climbed back towards the middle of the top division.

Boathouse

The current boat house was purchased from the First and Third Trinity Boat Club in 1958 under the leadership of David Bailey, the captain in 1957. He was approached after the 1957 May Bumps by the captain of First and Third (A A M Mays-Smith), who felt that St Catharine's showed the most spirit and drive of those boat clubs without their own boathouse.  The boat house was formerly host to the 3rd Trinity boat club, a club of old Etonians and Westminsters, and was built in the early 1930s. The boathouse is located between the Goldie Boathouse and the 1st & 3rd Trinity Boat House.

In 2012, work began to renovate the boathouse, and the newly refurbished and extended boathouse was officially opened by the Master, Dame Jean Thomas, along with a long-time sponsor of the boat club, Herb Bate, on 16 March 2013. The extension now hosts separate male and female changing rooms with lockers and proper showers, as well as a kitchen and office; and the old upstairs has become an erg room with enough ergs for an VIII to train together.

References

External links
St Catharine's College Boat Club

Saint Catharine's
Boat
1833 establishments in England
Sports clubs established in 1833
Rowing clubs in Cambridgeshire
Rowing clubs in England
Rowing clubs of the River Cam